Tripura is a state of India.

Tripura may also refer to:

 Tripura (mythology), three cities in Hindu mythology
 Tripura Kingdom, or Twipra Kingdom, a historical kingdom of India from the 15th century to 1949
 Tripura (princely state), a princely state in India during and shortly after the British Raj
 Tripura (Telugu author) (1928–2013), Indian Telugu-language short-story writer
 Tripura (film), a 2015 Indian Telugu film
 Macrobrochis or Tripura, a genus of moths

See also
 Tripura Buranji, an 18th-century Indian manuscript
 Tripura Sundari, a Hindu goddess
 Tripurasundari (disambiguation)